Isebania, also Isibania, is a town in Tarime District, Mara Region, in northern Tanzania, at the border with Kenya.

Location
The town sits at the border, directly south of the town of Isebania, Kenya. The coordinates of the town are: 1°14'44.0"S, 34°28'32.0"E (Latitude:-1.245569; Longitude:34.475555).

Overview

See also
Isebania, Kenya
Mara Region

References

External links
Webpage of the East African Community

Cities in the Great Rift Valley
Populated places in Mara Region
Kenya–Tanzania border crossings